San Giovanni in Persiceto (from 1912 to 1927: Persiceto;) is a town and comune in the Metropolitan City of Bologna, northern Italy.
 
Located in the northern part of the Metropolitan City, bordering with the provinces of Modena and Ferrara, San Giovanni in Persiceto is surrounded by the municipalities of Anzola dell'Emilia, Castelfranco Emilia, Castello d'Argile, Cento, Crevalcore, Sala Bolognese and Sant'Agata Bolognese.

History

Middle Ages
The most ancestral records claim the town was first populated by Gauls, but later occupied by the Romans. The area appears to have been depopulated after the fall of the Western Roman Empire. The flooded plain remained uncultivated until the rule of the Exarchate of Ravenna, when lands were drained again. The Byzantines also built a defensive line in the territory against the Lombards, but c. 727, under King Liutprand, the Lombards overran the Castrum Persiceta. In the 728 Liutprand created the duchy of Persiceto. It is likely that the village formed as the traditional Borgo Rotondo (Round Village) under this new rule. With the fall of the Lombard Kingdom  in 774 the early-medieval district of Persiceto (later San Giovanni in Persiceto), that stretched up to stream Samoggia, fell under the rule of the County of Modena, then the Abbey of Nonantola exercised its power on the territory, and since the 9th century it was handed over to the County of Bologna. Likely that around the half of that century the parish church of San Giovanni was built by the Bishops of Bologna.

Also in the 9th century, the Abbots of Nonantola (western side) and Bishops of Bologna (eastern side) gave out the first "ad meliorandum" grants of swampy and untilled land to the inhabitants of Persiceto; these lands would form the future Partecipanza agraria (Agricultural Attendance). After a brief autonomy (11–12th century), San Giovanni in Persiceto again came under political control of Bologna, till at the beginning of the 16th century, it ultimately subjected to the Papal rule.

In the 13th and 14th centuries, the 'castle' or 'land' of S. Giovanni in Persiceto was enlarged by a second circle of walls outside the Borgo Rotondo and by expanded settlements, surrounded, like the castle, by ditches, gates and palisades. However, because of the rebellion of the inhabitants of Persiceto, ever since the 1420s, the High Council of Bologna decreed that the external villages and its palisades had to be removed, the ditches filled up and all buildings that might be used as fortress had to be destroyed.

The ring villages were destroyed by 1481, under the rule of Giovanni II Bentivoglio; while over the years the castle expanded to its present shape with new bastions and embankments. At the end of the 15th century, the Bentivoglio using designs of Gaspare Nadi, built the present city hall, acquired by the Community in 1612. In the final years of Bentivoglio's rule, a canal to help drain the boggy lowlands of Sant'Agata Bolognese, Crevalcore and San Giovanni in Persiceto, was completed: this canal, the Cavamento, made large swaths of northern Persiceto tillable and habitable, so that by the 1470s, the new parish of San Matteo della Decima and its church were built. The inhabitants of Persiceto thankfully donated to Giovanni Bentivoglio a vast piece of land, on which later the mansion and castle of la Giovannina was built.

Modern age
Between the 15-16th century hemp culture and weaving expanded; and new crops such as mulberry, rice, and maize, were introduced. Landownership became more concentrated and  sharecropping system consolidated, though the latter has been limited by the existence of Participants on a wide area. During the 16th century the Persiceto was overrun by foreign armies; the Agricultureal Attendance Institute Partecipanza was founded and a sharing of the common lands that took place every nine years was enhanced; the city centre underwent a process of impoverishment, whereas the weekly market on Wednesday kept flourishing thanks to old privileges. The local oligarchy of new families' faithful to the Church and subject to the Reggimento of Bologna and the Papal Legacy was established.

In the following two centuries, the castle interior underwent reconstruction; many  ('little kitchen-gardens') among the buildings disappeared in favour of new houses. Old medieval buildings were also destroyed, while some others were irreversibly modified. New churches and convents were built (among the other things, with the demolition of the old parish, a collegiate church was rebuilt there). The Ospedale del SS. Salvatore (now G. G. Croce Town Library and historical archive) was built on the grounds of the old fortress. The town theatre was built.

The incompetence of Papal governance impeded the development of the agriculture, whereas in other zones of the Po river valley advances in cultivation during half of the 18th century enhanced agricultural and economic progress. In Persiceto we can pinpoint samples of early rural industry: for centuries the inhabitants of Persiceto had cultivated hemp, not only for local production (together with cloth machining) for the weekly market, but also hemp which came from other places (such as Cento and Crevalcore) that was included in the trade. The surplus production of cloth was mostly exported to Venice.

French Revolutionary Wars
Persiceto was occupied by Revolutionary French troops in 1796, and the parishes of Persiceto and of Sant'Agata Bolognese were divided among into four cantons. The town of San Giovanni in Persiceto was briefly part of the Department of the Alta Padusa, with Cento as chief town (1797). Later it became the seat of the District of the Samoggia. Between 1798 and 1799 the community life was upset by plunderings, turmoils and seizures. However, in 1800 the District of Samoggia was restored. With the establishment of the Italian Republic (1802) San Giovanni in Persiceto was again under the Deputy Prefecture established in Cento. In the first years of the Ottocento and at the establishment of the Kingdom of Italy (March 1805) calm came back into the territory of the Persiceto, but this was again overturned in 1814 by the fall of Napoleon until the Papal government was restored in July 1815.

Between 1796 and 1815, although the structures of the boards of direction and their denominations were changed, in Persiceto mostly the same families did the same civil service: they were clearly fit for adaptation. Within the same years the feudal privileges and the tithe were abolished, the pieces of land belonging to the Church were forfeited and the landed property was accumulated. The rice culture, with its following crisis of the sharecropping system, was expanded and so did even the agricultural day-labourers. With the restoration of the Papal rule remarkable works for the improvement of the "Castle" were started and in 1838 Pope Gregory XVI bestowed the title of city on San Giovanni. In 1857 Pius IX visited the town.

Persiceto after unification
Persiceto provided some volunteers in the wars of Independence even before the region was annexed to the Kingdom of Sardinia in 1860; but when the hated grist-tax was reintroduced by the national government, in San Giovanni in Persiceto, an insurrection of peasants developed on 7 January 1869). Meanwhile, some handicraft shops had become larger and were turned into factories that employed hundreds of workers: for instance, nail blacksmiths became big managers and started producing iron beds and furniture that were sold even abroad, so that San Giovanni in Persiceto merited the name of little Manchester of the Emilia.

In 1892 the 1st of May was celebrated for the first time with a private meeting. In 1893 the socialist section was founded. In the 1980s it reached high productivity and trading levels (the mark COM is known all around the world). The modern political parties that developed their propaganda even with the help of many famous local papers turned out to be particularly lively and quarrelsome. In 1904 in the borough of San Giovanni in Persiceto for the first time a socialist representative was elected (Giacomo Ferri). In the same year the first  was inaugurated. In 1907 even the ruling of the Comune was handed over to the Socialists (as an anticlerical inspiration it was named, from 1912 to 1927, Persiceto).

After World War I land disputes again recurred, during which the massacre of Decima by public forces (5 April 1920) was carried out; in the political and social challenges particularly the fascists resorted to force against the socialists and their institution: many people of Persiceto had to leave the country because of their antifascist resentments or had to undergo jail or confinement.

World War II and after
During World War II, especially during the 20 months of the German occupation, resistance against the Nazis and the fascists developed in Persiceto and local partisans in the 63rd Garibaldi brigade sabotaged the transit of Nazi-fascist trucks and cars along the main road Bologna Verona Brennerpass, the passage of train convoys on the railway, electric lines and phone lines. The partisan forces underwent heavy losses after the mopping-up operations in Amola (5 December 1944), in Borgata Città (7 December) and in many other opportunities. At the end of the war, the night of 20 April 1945, partisan brigades took control of warehouses and factories to prevent their destruction by German troops in retreat, whereas the Allied troops entered the town the following night. After liberation, the inhabitants of Persiceto took part with commitment and interest in the political and social fights. In the elections, the left-wing parties (the communist and the socialist), prevailed and ruled together the municipality until 1980; the country fights record again force acts; heavy ideologies have riven the town. After the 1950s San Giovanni in Persiceto, a centre of agricultural production known for its markets (when in the Foro Boario thousands of cattle were gathered), underwent deep transformation from a mainly agricultural economy to an industrial and trading economy. The countryside was depopulated and the city expanded, which became the place of many high school addresses; after some decades of oblivion, the city library was born again; an important intermunicipal centre of sport plants and an extremely modern astronomical observatory were founded thereafter.

Main sights
 Civico Orto Botanico "Ulisse Aldrovandi", a botanical garden
 Astronomical Observatory and Planetarium

Famous people
Marco Belinelli (1986), basketball player with the San Antonio Spurs (NBA);
Alberto Bergamini (1871-1962), director of "Il giornale d'Italia" and liberal senator;
Raffaele Pettazzoni (1883-1959), historian of religions and academic;
Agostino Bignardi (1921-1983), national secretary of the liberal party from 1972 to 1976 and university professor of the history of agriculture.

Trivia
 In Sturmtruppen, a famous Italian comic strip written by Bonvi, San Giovanni in Persiceto is the birthplace of one of the main characters, the Fiero Alleaten Galeazzo Musolesi.
 On 7 July 1969, the town of San Giovanni in Persiceto was chosen by the first section of the criminal court in Palermo where forced to send to the stay for four years, Salvatore Totò Riina. In the same year Riina started the hiding, before reaching the place of confinement.
 Main-belt minor planet 69245 Persiceto is named after the town.

Sources

External links

Cities and towns in Emilia-Romagna